The Grand Canal at the Church of the Salute is an oil on canvas painting by Canaletto. It is a Rococo landscape painting, completed circa 1740. It measures  and is now in the Emil Georg Bührle collection, Zurich, Switzerland.

A rendition of this work is similar to that purchased by King George III, which is currently held as part of the Royal Collection Trust.

See also

References

1740s paintings
Paintings of Venice by Canaletto
Paintings of Venice